The Swan 60 was designed by German Frers and first launched in 1994. The first one produced was a highly customised performance version called Highland Fling which had notable racing success. The model evolved into a regatta version and the cruiser/racer (this had a transom extension and increased displacement etc.) although most boats were customised to some level. The hull moulding was used for the Swan 62 RS a cruising model to go alongside the newly designed racer/cruiser the Swan 601 however this model (the Swan 60) was effectively relaunched under Swan 62 "FD" version banner after a couple of years.

External links
 Nautor Swan
 German Frers Official Website

References

Sailing yachts
Keelboats
1990s sailboat type designs
Sailboat types built by Nautor Swan
Sailboat type designs by Germán Frers